Esperanza Casteleiro Llamazares (born 18 December 1956) is a Spanish intelligence officer who has served as director of the National Intelligence Center since May 2022. She was previously Secretary of State for Defense from 2020 to 2022.

Casteleiro has spent almost all of her career in the Spanish intelligence services, first in the Centro Superior de Información de la Defensa (CESID) and then in the National Intelligence Center (CNI). She also held important positions in the Ministry of Defense between 2018 and 2022, first as director of the cabinet of minister of defense Margarita Robles, and then as secretary of state for defense.

Life 
Casteleiro was born in Madrid on 18 December 1956. Her father, Antonio Casteleiro Naveiras, was a soldier from Mugardos, A Coruña, who served in the Spanish Air Force during the Franco era. She studied Philosophy and Educational Sciences at the Complutense University of Madrid, and she has taken various training courses in the fields of intelligence and human resources. She is considered an expert on counterterrorism and on the Maghreb region.

Career 
In 1983, Casteleiro joined the Centro Superior de Información de la Defensa (CESID), which became the National Intelligence Center (CNI) in 2002. She has held various key positions in these agencies, including leading the counterintelligence division and the human resources management department at CNI. She has been deployed in foreign countries like Cuba and Portugal.

In 2004 the government of José Luis Rodríguez Zapatero, with José Bono as minister of defense, appointed her as secretary-general of the CNI, making her CNI director 's number two.

After leaving the position of secretary-general, Casteleiro held other foreign intelligence positions. In 2014 she was appointed as head of the CNI intelligence unit in the Intelligence Center for Counter-Terrorism and Organized Crime (CITCO), a position she held until June 2018, when she was appointed head of the cabinet of minister of defense Margarita Robles.

In early 2020 she was reported to be a possible candidate to replace Félix Sanz Roldán as head of the CNI, but instead, the government appointed the agency's secretary-general at the time, Paz Esteban López. Then in mid-2020, she was rumored to be a possible replacement for departing secretary of state for defense . She was appointed as secretary of state for defence on 1 July 2020.

In a meeting on 10 May 2022, the Council of Ministers appointed her director of the CNI, replacing Paz Esteban López following the Pegasus spyware scandal.

Awards 

References 

Spanish spies
1956 births
Living people
Secretaries of State of Spain
Spanish women